Emiliotia rubrostriata is a species of sea snail, a marine gastropod mollusk in the family Colloniidae.

Description
The height of the shell reaches 1.4 mm.

Distribution
This species occurs in the Gulf of Mexico, the Caribbean Sea and the Lesser Antilles; the Atlantic Ocean off West Florida, the Bahamas and Canary Islands.

References

 Rolán, E., F. Rubio and R. Fernández-Garcés. 1997. A new species of Bothropoma (Gastropoda, Turbinidae) from Cuba. Argonauta 11: 19–24.
 Faber M.J. 2006. Marine gastropods from the ABC islands and other localities. 8. On the distribution of "Bothropoma" rubrostriatum Rolán, Rubio & Fernández-Garcés, 1997, with the introduction of Emiliotia, n.gen. (Gastropoda: Turbinidae). Miscellanea Malacologica, 2(1): 13-18

External links
  Rosenberg, G.; Moretzsohn, F.; García, E. F. (2009). Gastropoda (Mollusca) of the Gulf of Mexico, Pp. 579–699 in: Felder, D.L. and D.K. Camp (eds.), Gulf of Mexico–Origins, Waters, and Biota. Texas A&M Press, College Station, Texas

Colloniidae
Gastropods described in 1997